Ime is a village in Norway.

IME or ime may refer to:

Organizations
 Institution of Mechanical Engineers, British engineering society
 Instituto Militar de Engenharia (Military Institute of Engineering), Rio de Janeiro, Brazil
 Instituto de los Mexicanos en el Exterior, Mexican government institute
 Iran Mercantile Exchange

Science and technology
 Input method editor, allowing entry of symbols not  on keyboard
 In-Movie Experience, to view bonus content on HD-DVD and Blu-ray Disc
 Intel Management Engine, for Intel Active Management Technology 
 Intron-mediated enhancement, a biological process

Science and Law
 Independent medical examination, by a health professional not involved in a patient's treatment
 Indirect Medical Education, a type of Medicare payment issued to teaching hospitals

People
 Ime Akpan (born 1972), retired female track and field athlete from Nigeria
 Ime Udoka (born 1977), Nigerian-American basketball coach and former player
 Ime Bishop Umoh, Nigerian actor and comedian

Entertainment
I Me or iMe, a multinational girl group from China and Thailand
I Mother Earth, a Canadian alternative rock band

See also
 I Am Me (disambiguation)
 
 
 Imes (disambiguation)

African given names
Unisex given names